Songshan District  may refer to:

 Songshan District, Chifeng
 Songshan District, Taipei